Caponia, also called eight-eyed orange lungless spiders, is an Afrotropical genus of araneomorph spiders in the family Caponiidae, first described by Eugène Simon in 1887. As the common name implies, these spiders have a tightly arranged set of eight eyes, as opposed to the related two-eyed genus Diploglena, and breathe using two pairs of tracheae rather than book lungs. They are agile, nocturnal hunters, that hide by day in a variety of silk-lined retreats.

Species
 it contains ten species:
Caponia braunsi Purcell, 1904 – South Africa
Caponia capensis Purcell, 1904 – South Africa, Mozambique
Caponia chelifera Lessert, 1936 – Mozambique
Caponia forficifera Purcell, 1904 – South Africa
Caponia hastifera Purcell, 1904 – South Africa, Mozambique
Caponia karrooica Purcell, 1904 – South Africa
Caponia natalensis (O. Pickard-Cambridge, 1874) (type) – Tanzania, Mozambique, South Africa
Caponia secunda Pocock, 1900 – South Africa
Caponia simoni Purcell, 1904 – South Africa
Caponia spiralifera Purcell, 1904 – South Africa

References

Araneomorphae genera
Caponiidae
Spiders of Africa
Taxa named by Eugène Simon